General elections were held in the Netherlands on 17 and 25 June 1913. Despite receiving the fourth highest number of votes, the General League of Roman Catholic Caucuses emerged as the largest party, winning 25 of the 100 seats in the House of Representatives. After the election, the independent liberal Pieter Cort van der Linden became Prime Minister of the Netherlands, leading a cabinet of Liberals, Free-thinking Democrats, Christian Historicals and other independent liberals.

Results

By district
  Social Democratic  
  Free-thinking Democratic  
  Liberal  
  Free Liberal  
  Christian Historical  
  Anti-Revolutionary  
  Roman Catholic

Notes

References

General elections in the Netherlands
Netherlands
1913 in the Netherlands
Election and referendum articles with incomplete results
1913 elections in the Netherlands
June 1913 events